Montecarmelo is a station on Line 10 of the Madrid Metro. It is located in fare Zone A. The station gives service to the homonymous neighborhood, Madrid, Alcobendas and San Sebastián de los Reyes.

References 

Line 10 (Madrid Metro) stations
Railway stations in Spain opened in 2007
Buildings and structures in Fuencarral-El Pardo District, Madrid